Romanzo popolare (internationally released as Come Home and Meet My Wife) is a 1974 Italian comedy drama film directed by Mario Monicelli. The film won the David di Donatello for Best Script.

Cast 
Ugo Tognazzi: Giulio Basletti
Ornella Muti: Vincenzina Rotunno
Michele Placido: Giovanni Pizzullo
Pippo Starnazza: Salvatore
Nicolina Papetti: Salvatore's wife
Vincenzo Crocitti: Maronati
Alvaro Vitali: The Car Driver

References

External links

1973 films
Commedia all'italiana
Films directed by Mario Monicelli
Italian comedy-drama films
Films set in Milan
Adultery in films
Social realism in film
Films with screenplays by Age & Scarpelli
1970s Italian-language films
1970s Italian films